The 1958 European Judo Championships were the 7th edition of the European Judo Championships, and were held in Barcelona, Spain from 10 to 11 May 1958.

Medal winners

References 

European Judo Championships
European Judo Championships
European Judo Championships
Sport in Barcelona
International sports competitions hosted by Spain
E